Maryino may refer to:
Maryino District, a district of the federal city of Moscow, Russia
Maryino (rural locality), several rural localities in Russia
Maryino (Moscow Metro), a station on the Lyublinskaya Line of Moscow Metro, Moscow, Russia

See also
Marino (disambiguation)